La vie sait is the sixth studio album by French singer Priscilla Betti, released by Capitol Music France on May 19, 2017.

The album debuted at number 35 in France.

Track listing

Charts

References 

2017 albums
Priscilla Betti albums
Universal Music France albums